Chipinge North is a constituency in southeastern Zimbabwe in the province of Manicaland near the Mozambique border. It is named after Chipinge town.

Chipinge is one of the constituencies where the ZANU–PF was declared the winner at the 2005 general election. The government is accused of irregularities in this constituency at the election. 

Parliamentary constituencies in Zimbabwe